Dendrobium barbatulum (small-bearded dendrobium) is a species of orchid endemic to southern India.

References

barbatulum
Endemic orchids of India